Johannes Sauer (born February 16, 1968 in Johannesburg, South Africa) is a South African-born Canadian sport shooter. He is a two-time Canadian shooting champion, and a gold medalist for the rifle prone at the 2005 Championships of the Americas in Salinas, California.

Sauer represented his adopted country of Canada at the 2008 Summer Olympics in Beijing, where he competed in the men's 50 m rifle prone. He finished only in forty-fourth place by one point behind South Korea's Park Bong-Duk from the fifth attempt, for a total score of 587 targets.

References

External links

Profile – Canadian Olympic Team
NBC 2008 Olympics profile

Afrikaner people
Canadian male sport shooters
Living people
Olympic shooters of Canada
Shooters at the 2008 Summer Olympics
South African emigrants to Canada
Sportspeople from Vancouver
Sportspeople from Johannesburg
1968 births